Petrukhin is a surname of Russian origin. People with that name include:

 Vladimir Petrukhin
 Vyacheslav Petrukhin

Surnames of Russian origin